Suuri kupla was a Finnish playful quiz show for youths about comics and cartoons. On the show, two teams competed against one another. In the first Jukka Heiskanen acted as host and later Sami Garam and Ellen Jokikunnas. In its last years Tuulianna Tola hosted the program.

Quiz shows
Finnish game shows
Finnish children's television series